Chikhli is a city and a municipal council in Buldana district in Vidarbha Region of Maharashtra state, India. It is located on the Pune-Nagpur highway. It is situated at the westernmost border of Vidarbha region of Maharashtra and is 500 km from the state capital, Mumbai.
Chikhli has the largest population in buldhana district and is the biggest taluka.
Chikhli is situated on the border of the Marathwada Region and Vidarbha Regions of Maharashtra. Chikhli is the nearest municipal council to the district place, Buldana, approximately 25 km only. Also in addition, there is a cotton factory in Chikhli which provides employment to many people who comes in this city for employment purpose. MIDC is located on Nagpur-Pune highway where many small scale, middle scale and some large scale firms of automotive, chemical, fibres and plastic, iron casting and other sectors are situated. Textile park was sanctioned near city and land acquisition and other government processes are going on regarding this.

Geography and climate 
It has an average elevation of 606 metres (1988 feet).Cool climate in the city when compared to numa region. Summer is also not so hot as compared to other Vidarbha regions. The annual rainfall averages 800 mm. Most of the rainfall occurs in the monsoon season between June and September, but some rain does fall during January and February.

Demographics 
 India census, Chikhli had a population of 57,889. Males constitute 52% of the population and females, 48%. Chikhli has an average literacy rate of 74%, higher than the national average of 59.5%; with male literacy of 81% and female literacy of 67%. 13% of the population is under 6 years of age. The rate of literacy is high due to school facility available and awareness in the people. Marathi is the main language of communication.

Transport
The city is connected to other major cities of Maharashtra by State Highway 24 (Baitul (Madhya Pradesh) to Chandwad (Nashik)) and State Highway 176 (Malkapur to Solapur) and National Highway 753A (Buldana to Shirdi). There is a state project to build a 4-lane highway between Chikhli and Malkapur, but has been postponed due to some problems in the Rajur Ghat near Buldana.

Railway facilities are not available in Chikhli. Railway connection has always been difficult because of the surrounding mountainous area. The nearest railhead is at Malkapur  and Nandura  also Jalna . The nearest rail junctions are Akola  and Aurangabad .
However, in 2016 railway budget NDA government sanctioned and allotted Rs3000 crores for Khamgaon -Jalna railway line. After completion of this project Chikhli will be a major railway station on Khamgaon-Jalna railway line.
Chikhli-Burhanpur and Malkapur-Solapur railway lines are also proposed. After completion of those lines, Chikhli will emerge as a major junction in the region.

The nearest airport is at Aurangabad, . There have been demands for a domestic airport in Buldhana, the district place, 25 km from Chikhli, as it has several pilgrimage and historical centres such as Shegaon, Sailani, Lonar and Sindkhed Raja.

Education
Chikhli is also famous for education in Buldana district. Adarsh Vidyalaya and Shivaji Vidyalaya are famous for well education traditional programs sports and various activities. Higher study colleges like Anuradha Engineering College, Anuradha Pharmacy College, Anuradha Polytechnic College, Anuradha Nursing and Cosmetics Colleges (located approximately 4 km from main city) and the Abhinav College of Education, Sunil Ramsinghji Chunawale BAMS College (under Maharashtra University of Health Science, Nashik), Shivaji Science College, SPM Arts and Commerce College are located in Chikhli.
Educationally, it falls under Amravati University.
List of schools

1. Adarsha Vidyalaya

2. Shivaji Vidyalaya 

3. Radhabai Khedekar Vidyalaya

4. Anuradha English medium school

5. Adarsh convent 

6. Hallelujah highschool

7. N.P schools

8. Z.P high school
and more than 50 schools serving the city.

Culture
The ancient historical temple of Renuka Devi is situated in the heart of city. The only one temple of pandav is situated in the nearby village Kawhala.

There is a large celebration on Hanuman Jayanthi, where thousands of people join the rally and celebrate their faith towards Renuka Devi.
There is Panchmukhi Mahadeo Temple on Khamgaon road near vishwabharmama shelake mala.
Shri Siddha Science Temple near Gondhane Complex on Mehkar Phata Road, which is famous for lord Shiva and Siddha Science, which is scientific spirituality or yoga.
There is Shriram mandir in the old city, ram navami is celebrated each year with pleasure by peoples.

Prominent places 
Renuka Devi

Renuka Devi is deity of Chikhli.  Renuka Devi temple is located in the heart of the town. Chaitra pournima and Hanuman Jayanti is a day when Renuka Devi "Yatra" is organized.

Khairullah Shah Miyan Dargah

Khairullah Shah Miyan Dargah is the best religious place located in Chikhli. Peoples from all over Maharashtra visit over there for "ziyarat" at the time of URS and Sandal. This Sandal is held exactly after three days of Holi festival.

President of India visited the city statue 

17 July 2009 - Felicitated by President Smt. Pratibha Patil at Chikhali on inauguration of "Maharana Pratap" statue.

Banking and (ATM) financial services 
In the 2000s (decade), almost all public sector and private banks have opened up branches including the State Bank of India, State Bank of Hyderabad, Axis Bank, Saraswat Bank, Bank of India, HDFC Bank, Bank of Maharashtra, Indian Overseas Bank, Kotak Mahindra Bank and  Other Co-Operative Banks also available. Many banks also provide with ATM services.

Medical facilities 
Chikhli is well known for its medical facilities in a nearby area. The city has the largest number of hospitals and clinics in the region. A government hospital is also available to citizens. A hospital with 24-hour services is available.

References

External links 
 Buldhana District Gazetteer - Chikhli

Talukas in Maharashtra